The 1974–75 QMJHL season was the sixth season in the history of the Quebec Major Junior Hockey League. Ten teams played 72 games each in the schedule. The Sherbrooke Castors finished first overall in the regular season to capture the Jean Rougeau Trophy, and won the President's Cup, defeating the Laval National in the finals.

Team changes
 The Drummondville Rangers cease operations.

Final standings
Note: GP = Games played; W = Wins; L = Losses; T = Ties; PTS = Points; GF = Goals For; GA = Goals Against

complete list of standings.

Scoring leaders
Note: GP = Games played; G = Goals; A = Assists; Pts = Points; PIM = Penalties in Minutes

 complete scoring statistics

Playoffs
Mike Bossy was the leading scorer of the playoffs with 38 points (18 goals, 20 assists).

Quarterfinals
 Sherbrooke Castors defeated Hull Festivals 4 games to 0.
 Montreal Bleu Blanc Rouge defeated Cornwall Royals 4 games to 0.
 Laval National defeated Trois-Rivières Draveurs 4 games to 2.
 Chicoutimi Saguenéens defeated Quebec Remparts 4 games to 2.

Semifinals
 Laval National defeated Montreal Bleu Blanc Rouge 4 games to 1.
 Sherbrooke Castors defeated Chicoutimi Saguenéens 4 games to 0.

Finals
 Sherbrooke Castors defeated Laval National 4 games to 1.

All-star teams
First team
 Goaltender - Mario Viens, Cornwall Royals
 Left defence - Richard Mulhern, Sherbrooke Castors
 Right defence - Francois Vachon, Trois-Rivières Draveurs
 Left winger - Normand Dupont, Montreal Bleu Blanc Rouge
 Centreman - Jean-Luc Phaneuf, Montreal Bleu Blanc Rouge
 Right winger - Mike Bossy, Laval National
 Coach - Orval Tessier, Cornwall Royals
Second team 
 Goaltender - Normand Lapointe, Trois-Rivières Draveurs 
 Left defence - Robert Picard, Montreal Bleu Blanc Rouge
 Right defence - Donald Lemieux, Quebec Remparts 
 Left winger - Claude Larose, Drummondville Rangers 
 Centreman - Sidney Versey, Sherbrooke Castors
 Right winger - Pierre Mondou, Montreal Bleu Blanc Rouge
 Coach - Ghislain Delage, Sherbrooke Castors
 List of First/Second/Rookie team all-stars.

Trophies and awards
Team
President's Cup - Playoff Champions, Sherbrooke Castors
Jean Rougeau Trophy - Regular Season Champions, Sherbrooke Castors

Player
Michel Brière Memorial Trophy - Most Valuable Player, Mario Viens, Cornwall Royals
Jean Béliveau Trophy - Top Scorer, Normand Dupont, Montreal Bleu Blanc Rouge
Jacques Plante Memorial Trophy - Best GAA, Nick Sanza, Sherbrooke Castors
Michel Bergeron Trophy - Rookie of the Year, Denis Pomerleau, Hull Festivals
Frank J. Selke Memorial Trophy - Most sportsmanlike player, Jean-Luc Phaneuf, Montreal Bleu Blanc Rouge

See also
1975 Memorial Cup
1975 NHL Entry Draft
1974–75 OMJHL season
1974–75 WCHL season

References
 Official QMJHL Website
 www.hockeydb.com/

Quebec Major Junior Hockey League seasons
QMJHL